Pushpavanam is a village in Vedaranyam subdistrict in Nagapattinam District in the Indian state of Tamil Nadu.

Geography
Pushpavanam is seashore village 10.3 km north of Vedaranyam taluk in Nagapattinam District, Tamil Nadu State in India. It is 34.8 km south of Nagapattinam and 291 km from Chennai. It is located on the Bay of Bengal. With the Vedaranyam Canel (Uppanar River) to the southwest and the Vettar River to the north, Pushpavanam is effectively on an island.

Pushpavanam shares its postal pincode (614809) with other villages such as Thethakudi, Periyakuthagai, Sembodai, Kallimedu, and Thamaraipulam.

Etymology
In sanskrit, "pushpam" means flower, and "vanam" means forest. It is thought to derive its name from people taking flowers to the village from Vedaranyeswarar temple during puja. Another thought is that in the Mahābhārata, Draupadi took flowers to this village.

Economy
Agricultural crops include coconut, mango, cashew nut, rice, peanuts, and Gloriosa superba, known locally as kalappai kizhangu, kaarthigai kizhangu, or kanvali kizhangu, or sengaanthal. Fishing is a common profession.

Education
Pushpavanam is served by several State Board Schools, including:
Aided Middle School
Govt. Higher Secondary School
Guru Dhakshinamoorthy Primary School
Vinayaga Primary School
Panchayat Union School, Pattinatheru
Panchayat Union School, Kothankadu

History
The village is about a 500 years old.

Demographics
 census, it had a population of 6,705 in 1,799 households. There are active Hindu, Islamic and Christian communities.

References

Villages in Nagapattinam district